On 22 April 2022, at least six people were killed and seven injured in a suicide bombing at a restaurant in Mogadishu, Somalia. The Pescatore Seafood Restaurant had recently opened in the seaside area of Lido Beach. The explosion was detonated by an Al-Shabaab suicide bomber who had been denied access inside the restaurant, where the Somali Police Commissioner and several lawmakers gathered to have an Iftar meal to break the Ramadan fast. None of the legislators were harmed in the explosion, but some of the security personnel were among those killed in the blast. Local police did not specify how many, but did say those killed were mostly civilians.

See also 
 2022 timeline of the Somali Civil War
 January 2016 Mogadishu attack, another attack in Lido Beach

References 

2022 murders in Somalia
2020s building bombings
2020s crimes in Mogadishu
21st-century mass murder in Somalia
Attacks on buildings and structures in 2022
Al-Shabaab (militant group) attacks in Mogadishu
Islamic terrorist incidents in 2022
Building bombings in Somalia
Mass murder in 2022
Mass murder in Mogadishu
April 2022 crimes in Africa
Terrorist incidents in Somalia in 2022
Attacks on restaurants in Africa
Suicide bombings in 2022
Suicide bombings in Mogadishu